Yacht delivery is an industry organized around moving vessels - sailing or power  yachts - from one destination to another anywhere around the world on their own hulls.  It is largely a private industry working on daily or lump sum rates, where normally the captain is paid the most or is the only person among the crew that is paid. There are tens of thousands of private yachts, which move from country to country or coastwise within a country annually.

Delivery of sailing yachts on their own hulls has a smaller carbon footprint than yacht transport on a ship. More than three percent of global carbon dioxide emissions can be attributed to ocean-going ships. Yacht delivery of a sailing yacht reduces carbon dioxide emissions by a factor of 20 to 70 compared to yacht transport on a ship and even further reduction is possible when the yacht is equipped with solar panels.

References 

Yachting
Sailing